Ayr United Football Club are a Scottish association football team based in Ayr, South Ayrshire. This list details the club's achievements in major competitions, and the top scorers for each season.

Key

 P = Played
 W = Games won
 D = Games drawn
 L = Games lost
 F = Goals for
 A = Goals against
 Pts = Points
 Pos = Final position

 R1 = Round 1
 R2 = Round 2
 R3 = Round 3
 R4 = Round 4
 R5 = Round 5
 QF = Quarter-finals
 SF = Semi-finals
 F = Final

Seasons

Notes and references

Seasons
 
Ayr United